USCGC Vigorous (WMEC-627) is a United States Coast Guard Reliance Class medium endurance cutter.

Service summary
Her keel was laid down by American Ship Building Company, Lorain, Ohio 10 November 1967 and she was launched 4 May 1968. Vigorous was commissioned 2 May 1969 and her current homeport is Virginia Beach, VA.

Her initial homeport was in New London, Connecticut where she was moored at the United States Coast Guard Academy.  She was decommissioned for modernization at the United States Coast Guard Yard in Curtis Bay, Maryland, in early 1992 and was recommissioned on 11 January 1993.

During the 2010 Caribbean Games in Mayaguez, Puerto Rico, the Vigorous maintained a security zone in Mayaguez harbor.

On 11 February 2013, the Vigorous stood by the disabled 102,000-ton cruise ship Carnival Triumph adrift in the Gulf of Mexico waiting to be towed. On Sunday, 10 February 2013 at 5:30 a.m. CST, the Carnival Triumph suffered a fire in her aft engine room. Although the fire was automatically extinguished and there were no injuries to passengers or crew, it resulted in a loss of propulsion and power to all support systems. With 4,229 persons on board, raw sewage began to back up into the lower passenger deck areas. This caused the media to dub the event "The Poop Cruise." A Coast Guard supplied emergency generator was providing minimal electrical power, while the ship was adrift about 150 miles off the northern coast of the Yucatán Peninsula in the Gulf of Mexico. The ship was originally expected to be towed to the Mexican port of Progreso. However, after being carried north by currents while awaiting arrival of large, seagoing tugboats, she was towed to Mobile, Alabama instead. Vigorous escorted Carnival Triumph during her tow.

During May 2014, the Vigorous was spearheading the search for the Yacht Cheeki Rafiki one thousand miles east of Cape Cod, which went missing on a delivery voyage from Antigua to Southampton, England. The overturned hull of the capsized Cheeki Rafiki was found on the evening of 23 May 2014 with the keel broken off and the uninflated life raft inside the hull. All four sailors on board were presumed lost at sea.

Awards
While in service, Vigorous has been awarded:

Coast Guard Presidential Unit Citation
United States Secretary of Transportation's Gold Medal for Outstanding Achievement
4 Coast Guard Unit Commendations
6 Coast Guard Meritorious Unit Commendations
Meritorious Team Commendation
Coast Guard Bicentennial Unit Commendation
15 Coast Guard "E" Ribbons
3 National Defense Service Medals
Global War on Terrorism Service Medal
2 Humanitarian Service Medals
Department of Transportation 9-11 Ribbon
2 Coast Guard Special Operations Service Ribbons
13 Coast Guard Sea Service Ribbons

References

External links

USCGC Vigorous home page

Historic American Engineering Record in Virginia
Reliance-class cutters
Ships of the United States Coast Guard
1968 ships
Ships built in Lorain, Ohio